Moorook Game Reserve is a protected area in the Australian state of South Australia covering the floodplain on the south side of the River Murray in the localities of Kingston-on-Murray  and Moorook immediately south of the section of the Sturt Highway that passes between the towns of Kingston-on-Murray in the west and Cobdogla in the east.

The game reserve occupies land in sections 474, 475 and 476 in the cadastral unit of the Hundred of Moorook which covers  Wachtels Lagoon and low-lying land to the south-east. It was proclaimed on 2 September 1976 under the National Parks and Wildlife Act 1972. The Loch Luna Game Reserve immediately adjoins the game reserve's northern boundary. It and the Loch Luna Game Reserve are reported as providing "significant wildlife habitat and are popular recreation sites, particularly for river-based activities and camping".

In 1980, the game reserve was described as follows:
Moorook Game Reserve is an area of wetland habitat in the River Murray floodplain 9kms west of Barmera (3km south of Kingston-on-Murray).  It has been reserved for the management and conservation of waterfowl, particularly native game species.  Shooting of some species is permitted during restricted open seasons…  

Moorook Game Reserve encompasses a large open swamp, Wachtel's Lagoon, fringed by river red gums (Eucalyptus camaldulensis) and river box (Eucalyptus largiflorens).  It is situated on the western bank of the River Murray, 3km. south of Kingston-on-Murray.  Development of a small area of the Reserve for controlled production of waterfowl food crops is planned for the near future.  These crops will be grown in the southwestern corner of the Reserve…  

Mostly unmodified, although irrigation drainage and some local effluent seep into one corner of the Reserve.

The game reserve is classified as an IUCN Category VI protected area.  In 1980, it was listed on the now-defunct Register of the National Estate.

See also
Duck hunting in South Australia
Riverland Biosphere Reserve

References

External links
Moorook and Loch Luna Game Reserves official webpage
Moorook Game Reserve brochure
Moorook Game Reserve webpage on protected planet

Game reserves of South Australia
Protected areas established in 1976
1976 establishments in Australia
Murray River
South Australian places listed on the defunct Register of the National Estate